Patrick Henry Joseph Trimborn (born 18 May 1940) is a former South African cricketer who played in four Test matches from 1967 to 1970.

A right-arm fast-medium bowler, Trimborn played first-class cricket for Natal from 1961 to 1976. His best bowling figures came in Natal's match against South African Universities in 1969-70 when he took 5 for 51 and 6 for 36.

He was selected to tour England in 1970 and Australia in 1971-72, but neither tour took place.

References

External links
 

1940 births
Living people
South Africa Test cricketers
South African cricketers
KwaZulu-Natal cricketers
International Cavaliers cricketers
South African Universities cricketers